Patulibacter is a genus of bacteria from the family Patulibacteraceae.

References

Further reading 
 
 
 

 

Actinomycetota
Bacteria genera